This is a list of articles related to Canadian oil sands:
 Athabasca oil sands
 Black Bonanza
 BP#Canadian oil sands
 Canadian Centre for Energy Information
 Canadian oil sands (disambiguation)
Climate change in Canada
 Cold Lake oil sands
 Environmental impact of mining
 History of Alberta#oil sands
 History of the petroleum industry in Canada (oil sands and heavy oil)
 Indiana Economic Development Corporation
 Keystone Pipeline
 Mackenzie Valley Pipeline
 Melville Island oil sands
 Oil megaprojects (2011)
 Peace River oil sands
 Project Oilsand / Project Cauldron
 Rising Tide North America
Suncor Energy
Syncrude Tailings Dam
 Utah Oil Sands Joint Venture
 Wabasco oil sands
 Yinka Dene Alliance

See also

Tony Clarke (activist)
Mitch Daniels
Thomas Homer-Dixon
Mike Hudema
Emily Hunter
Nikolai Kudryavtsev
Andrew Nikiforuk
Georg Naumann (Pioneer of the early use of natural gas)

Oil megaprojects
Petroleum production
 
Oil sands
Lists of topics